The 2015 FIM Cross-Country Rallies World Championship season was the 13th season of the FIM Cross-Country Rallies World Championship.

Austria's Matthias Walkner, riding a KTM, was the winner of the championship by 7 points ahead of Great Britain's Sam Sunderland, who also rode a KTM. Walkner won the season's fourth event, the Sardegna Rally Race, while Sunderland was the winner of the final event, the Rallye OiLibya du Maroc. Third place in the championship, 11 points further behind Sunderland, went to the best-placed Honda rider, Paulo Gonçalves. Defending champion Marc Coma finished fourth, after announcing his retirement midway through the season – he was the only rider to win more than one event, winning the first two events at the Abu Dhabi Desert Challenge and the Sealine Cross-Country Rally. Two other riders won races in 2015; Pablo Quintanilla won his home event at the Atacama Rally, and Poland's Jakub Piątek won the Rallye des Pharaons.

Calendar

The calendar for the 2015 season featured six rallies. Some of the rallies were also part of FIA Cross Country Rally World Cup. The Atacama Rally replaced Rallye dos Sertões for the 2015 season.

Results

Championship standings

Riders' championship
 Points for final positions were awarded as follows:

 A total of 152 riders scored championship points.

References

External links
 

FIM Cross-Country Rallies World Championship
FIM Cross-Country Rallies World Championship